The discography of Icelandic girl group Nylon consists of three studio albums, one compilation and one DVD. They are Iceland's most successful singer/songwriter girl-band, producing twelve number one singles, three number one studio albums, one number one compilation and one number one DVD in Iceland.

Albums

Studio albums

Compilation

Singles

Promo singles

DVD

References

External links
Official website
Nylon at Myspace
Nylon at Last.fm
Nylon at acharts.us

Pop music group discographies